George Rainy Reynolds Brown (8 December 1905 – 15 April 2000) was an English cricketer. He played for Essex between 1924 and 1932 and for Cambridge University in 1925; he later played a few first-class matches in India.

References

External links

1905 births
2000 deaths
English cricketers
Essex cricketers
People from Maldon, Essex
Cambridge University cricketers
Marylebone Cricket Club cricketers
Europeans cricketers
People from Storrington